Archibald Letsa is a Ghanaian politician and a member of the New Patriotic Party in Ghana. He is the Volta Regional minister of Ghana. He was appointed by President Nana Addo Danquah Akuffo-Addo in January 2017 and was approved by the Members of Parliament in February 2017.

Education 
Letsa had his secondary school education at St.Peter's Senior high school Nkwatia Kwahu Ghana.

References

New Patriotic Party politicians
People from Volta Region
St. Peter's Boys Senior High School alumni